The IBM 601 Multiplying Punch was a unit record machine that could read two numbers from a punched card and punch their product in a blank field on the same card. The factors could be up to eight decimal digits long. The 601 was introduced in 1931 and was the first IBM machine that could do multiplication.

In 1936 W. J. Eckert connected a modified 601 to a 285 tabulator and an 016 duplicating punch through a custom switch he designed and used the combined setup to perform scientific calculations.

See also
IBM 602
IBM 603
IBM 604

References

601
Programmable calculators
Products introduced in 1931